Luke the Evangelist (Latin: Lucas; , Loukâs; , Lūqās; , Lūqā’; Ge'ez: ሉቃስ) is one of the Four Evangelists—the four traditionally ascribed authors of the canonical gospels. The Early Church Fathers ascribed to him authorship of both the Gospel of Luke and the Acts of the Apostles. Prominent figures in early Christianity such as Jerome and Eusebius later reaffirmed his authorship, although a lack of conclusive evidence as to the identity of the author of the works has led to discussion in scholarly circles, both secular and religious.

The New Testament mentions Luke briefly a few times, and the Epistle to the Colossians refers to him as a physician (from Greek for 'one who heals'); thus he is thought to have been both a physician and a disciple of Paul.

Since the early years of the faith, Christians have regarded him as a saint. He is believed to have been a martyr, reportedly having been hanged from an olive tree, though some believe otherwise. The Catholic Church and other major denominations venerate him as Saint Luke the Evangelist and as a patron saint of artists, physicians, bachelors, surgeons, students and butchers; his feast day is 18 October.

Life 

Many scholars believe that Luke was a physician who lived in the Hellenistic city of Antioch in Ancient Syria, although some other scholars and theologians think Luke was a Hellenic Jew. While it has been widely accepted that the theology of Luke–Acts points to a gentile Christian writing for a gentile audience, some have  concluded that it is more plausible that Luke–Acts is directed to a community made up of both Jewish and gentile Christians since there is stress on the scriptural roots of the gentile mission (see the use of Isaiah 49:6 in Luke–Acts). Others have only been prepared to conclude that Luke was either a Hellenistic Jew or a God-fearer. DNA testing on what Christian tradition holds to be his body has revealed that he was of Syrian ancestry.

Whether Luke was a Jew or gentile, or something in between, it is clear from the quality of the Greek language used in Luke-Acts that he was one of the most highly educated of the authors of the New Testament.  His conscious and intentional allusions and references to, and quotations of, ancient Classical and Hellenistic Greek authors, such as Homer, Aesop, Epimenides, Euripides, Plato, and Aratus indicate that he was familiar with actual Greek literary texts.  This familiarity most likely derived from his experiences as a youth of the very homogeneous Hellenistic educational curriculum (ἐγκύκλιος παιδεία/enkyklios paideia) that had been, and would continue to be, used for centuries throughout the eastern Mediterranean.

Luke's earliest mention is in Philemon 1:24. The next earliest account of Luke is in the Anti-Marcionite Prologue to the Gospel of Luke, a document once thought to date to the 2nd century, but which has more recently been dated to the later 4th century.

Epiphanius states that Luke was one of the Seventy Apostles (Panarion 51.11), and John Chrysostom indicates at one point that the "brother" that Paul mentions in the Second Epistle to the Corinthians 8:18 is either Luke or Barnabas (Homily 18 on Second Corinthians on 2 Corinthians 8:18).

If one accepts that Luke was indeed the author of the Gospel bearing his name and the Acts of the Apostles, certain details of his personal life can be reasonably assumed. While he does exclude himself from those who were eyewitnesses to Jesus' ministry, he repeatedly uses the word "we" in describing the Pauline missions in Acts of the Apostles, indicating that he was personally there at those times.

The composition of the writings, as well as the range of vocabulary used, indicate that the author was an educated man. A quote in the Epistle to the Colossians differentiates between Luke and other colleagues "of the circumcision."

This comment has traditionally caused commentators to conclude that Luke was a gentile. If this were true, it would make Luke the only writer of the New Testament who can clearly be identified as not being Jewish. However, that is not the only possibility. Although Luke is considered likely to have been a gentile Christian, some scholars believe him to have been a Hellenized Jew. The phrase could just as easily be used to differentiate between those Christians who strictly observed the rituals of Judaism and those who did not.

Luke's presence in Rome with the Apostle Paul near the end of Paul's life was attested by 2 Timothy 4:11: "Only Luke is with me". In the last chapter of the Book of Acts, widely attributed to Luke, there are several accounts in the first person also affirming Luke's presence in Rome, including : "And when we came to Rome…" According to some accounts, Luke also contributed to the authorship of the Epistle to the Hebrews.

Luke died at age 84 in Boeotia, according to a "fairly early and widespread tradition". According to Nikephoros Kallistos Xanthopoulos, Greek historian of the 14th century (and others), Luke's tomb was located in Thebes, whence his relics were transferred to Constantinople in the year 357.

Authorship of Luke and Acts 

The Gospel of Luke does not name its author. The Gospel was not, nor does it claim to be, written by direct witnesses to the reported events, unlike Acts beginning in the sixteenth chapter. However, in most translations the author suggests that they have investigated the book's events and notes the name (Theophilus) of that to whom they are writing.

The earliest manuscript of the Gospel (Papyrus 75 = Papyrus Bodmer XIV-XV), dated  AD 200, ascribes the work to Luke; as did Irenaeus writing  AD 180, and the Muratorian fragment, a 7th-century Latin manuscript thought to be copied and translated from a Greek manuscript as old as AD 170.

The Gospel of Luke and the Acts of the Apostles make up a two-volume work which scholars call Luke–Acts. Together they account for 27.5% of the New Testament, the largest contribution by a single author.

As a historian 

Most scholars understand Luke's works (Luke–Acts) in the tradition of Greek historiography. Luke 1:1–4, drawing on historical investigation, identified the work to the readers as belonging to the genre of history. There is disagreement about how best to treat Luke's writings, with some historians regarding Luke as highly accurate, and others taking a more critical approach.

Based on his accurate description of towns, cities and islands, as well as correctly naming various official titles, archaeologist William Mitchell Ramsay wrote that "Luke is a historian of the first rank; not merely are his statements of fact trustworthy.  …[He] should be placed along with the very greatest of historians." Professor of Classics at Auckland University, Edward Musgrave Blaiklock, wrote: "For accuracy of detail, and for evocation of atmosphere, Luke stands, in fact, with Thucydides. The Acts of the Apostles is not shoddy product of pious imagining, but a trustworthy record.  …It was the spadework of archaeology which first revealed the truth." New Testament scholar Colin Hemer has made a number of advancements in understanding the historical nature and accuracy of Luke's writings.

On the purpose of Acts, New Testament scholar Luke Timothy Johnson has noted that "Luke's account is selected and shaped to suit his apologetic interests, not in defiance of but in conformity to ancient standards of historiography." Such a position is shared by Richard Heard, who sees historical deficiencies as arising from "special objects in writing and to the limitations of his sources of information."

In modern times, Luke's competence as a historian is questioned, depending upon one's a priori view of the supernatural. Since post-Enlightenment historians work with methodological naturalism, such historians would see a narrative that relates supernatural, fantastic things like angels, demons etc., as problematic as a historical source. Mark Powell claims that "it is doubtful whether the writing of history was ever Luke's intent. Luke wrote to proclaim, to persuade, and to interpret; he did not write to preserve records for posterity. An awareness of this, has been, for many, the final nail in Luke the historian's coffin."

Robert M. Grant has noted that although Luke saw himself within the historical tradition, his work contains a number of statistical improbabilities, such as the sizable crowd addressed by Peter in Acts 4:4. He has also noted chronological difficulties whereby Luke "has Gamaliel refer to Theudas and Judas in the wrong order, and Theudas actually rebelled about a decade after Gamaliel spoke (5:36–7)", though this report's status as a chronological difficulty is hotly disputed.

Brent Landau writes:

As an artist 

Christian tradition, starting from the 8th century, states that Luke was the first icon painter. He is said to have painted pictures of the Virgin Mary and Child, in particular the Hodegetria image in Constantinople (now lost). Starting from the 11th century, a number of painted images were venerated as his autograph works, including the Black Madonna of Częstochowa, Our Lady of Vladimir, and Madonna del Rosario. He was also said to have painted Saints Peter and Paul, and to have illustrated a gospel book with a full cycle of miniatures.

Late medieval Guilds of Saint Luke in the cities of Late Medieval Europe, especially Flanders, or the "Accademia di San Luca" (Academy of Saint Luke) in Rome—imitated in many other European cities during the 16th century—gathered together and protected painters. The tradition that Luke painted icons of Mary and Jesus has been common, particularly in Eastern Orthodoxy. The tradition also has support from the Saint Thomas Christians of India who claim to still have one of the Theotokos icons that Saint Luke painted and which Saint Thomas brought to India.

The art critic A. I. Uspensky writes that the icons attributed to the brush of the Evangelist Luke have a completely Byzantine character that was fully established only in the 5th-6th centuries.

Symbol 

In traditional depictions, such as paintings, evangelist portraits, and church mosaics, Saint Luke is often accompanied by an ox or bull, usually having wings. Sometimes only the symbol is shown, especially when in a combination of those of all Four Evangelists.

Veneration

The Eastern Orthodox Church commemorated Saint Luke, Apostle of the Seventy, Evangelist, companion (coworker) of the holy Apostle Paul, hieromartyr, physician, first icon painter on:
 22 April – Feast of Apostles of the Seventy: Nathaniel (Nathanael), Luke the Evangelist, Clement of Sardice or Clement of Rome and Apelles of Heraklion (Greek sources say that Saint Luke (Loukias) was someone other than the Evangelist Luke), the commoration is held second time commemorated together on 10 September.
 20 June – Translation of the relics and garments of the Apostles Luke, Andrew, and Thomas, the Prophet Eliseus, and Martyr Lazarus of Persia found , during the time of the emperor Romanos Lakapenos (919–44) in a monastery of Saint Augusta into the Church of the Holy Apostles in Constantinople under Emperor Constantine Porphyrogenitus (c. 956–70) by Saint Patriarch Polyeuctus of Constantinople (956–70).
 10 September – Feast of Apostles of the Seventy: Nathaniel (Nathanael), Luke the Evangelist, Clement of Sardice or Clement of Rome and Apelles of Heraklion (Greek sources say that Saint Luke (Loukias) was someone other than the Evangelist Luke), the commemoration is held first time commemorated together on 22 April.
 18 October – Feast of Apostle Luke
 4 January – Synaxis of the Seventy Apostles
 Synaxis of All Saints of Achaia – moveable holiday on Sunday between 23 and 29 November
 Synaxis of All Saints of Boeotia – moveable holiday on Saturday between 25 and 31 May

Relics 
Eight bodies and nine heads, located in different places, are presented as the relics of the Apostle Luke.

Despot George of Serbia purportedly bought the relics from the Ottoman sultan Murad II for 30,000 gold coins. After the Ottoman conquest of Bosnia, the kingdom's last queen, George's granddaughter Mary, who had brought the relics with her from Serbia as her dowry, sold them to the Venetian Republic.

In 1992, the then Greek Orthodox Metropolitan Ieronymos of Thebes and Levathia (who subsequently became Archbishop Ieronymos II of Athens and All Greece) requested from Bishop Antonio Mattiazzo of Padua the return of "a significant fragment of the relics of St. Luke to be placed on the site where the holy tomb of the Evangelist is located and venerated today". This prompted a scientific investigation of the relics in Padua, and by numerous lines of empirical evidence (archeological analyses of the Tomb in Thebes and the Reliquary of Padua, anatomical analyses of the remains, carbon-14 dating, comparison with the purported skull of the Evangelist located in Prague) confirmed that these were the remains of an individual of Syrian descent who died between AD 72 and AD 416. The Bishop of Padua then delivered to Metropolitan Ieronymos the rib of Saint Luke that was closest to his heart to be kept at his tomb in Thebes.

Thus, the relics of Saint Luke are divided as follows:
 The body, in the Abbey of Santa Giustina in Padua;
 The head, in the St. Vitus Cathedral in Prague;
 A rib, at his tomb in Thebes.

Gallery

See also 
 John the Evangelist
 Mark the Evangelist
 Matthew the Evangelist

References

Notes

Citations

Sources

 

 

 Documenting an international congress in Padua in 2000 on the topic of Luke the evangelist, including his relics.

 (In Greek and Latin parallel)

Further reading

 I. Howard Marshall. Luke: Historian and Theologian. Downers Grove,  IL: InterVarsity Press.
 F. F. Bruce,  The Speeches in the Acts of the Apostles . London: The Tyndale Press, 1942.
 Helmut Koester. Ancient Christian Gospels. Harrisburg,  PA: Trinity Press International, 1999.
 Burton L. Mack. Who Wrote the New Testament?: The Making of the Christian Myth. San Francisco,  CA: HarperCollins, 1996.
 J. Wenham, "The Identification of Luke", Evangelical Quarterly 63 (1991), 3–44

External links 

 Biblical Interpretation of Texts of Saint Luke
 Early Christian Writings: Gospel of Luke e-texts, introductions
 National Academy of Sciences on Luke the Evangelist
 Patron Saint Luke
 Photo of the grave of Luke in Padua (in German)
 DNA testing of the Saint Luke corpse
 Catholic Online

84 deaths
1st-century Christian martyrs
1st-century Greek physicians
1st-century writers
Four Evangelists
Ancient Syrian physicians
Antiochian Greek Christians
Black Madonna of Częstochowa
Burials at the Church of the Holy Apostles
Burials in Greece
Christianity in Roman Achaia
Gospel of Luke
Saints from Roman Anatolia
People in Acts of the Apostles
People in the Pauline epistles
Prophets in the Druze faith
Seventy disciples
Saints from Roman Syria
Year of birth unknown
Anglican saints